The 2023 NFL Draft will be the 88th annual meeting of National Football League (NFL) franchises to select newly eligible players. The draft is scheduled to be held in the plaza outside of Union Station in Kansas City, Missouri, on April 27–29, 2023.

The Chicago Bears originally owned the first overall pick for the first time since 1947 before trading it to the Carolina Panthers for multiple draft picks and wide receiver D. J. Moore.

Host city
Kansas City was chosen as the host city on May 22, 2019.

Player selections

Trades
In the explanations below, (PD) indicates trades completed prior to the start of the draft (i.e. Pre-Draft), while (D) denotes trades that took place during the 2023 draft.

Round one

Round two

Round three

Round four

Round five

Round six

Round seven

2020 Resolution JC-2A selections
Since the 2021 draft, the league, under 2020 Resolution JC-2A, rewards teams for developing minority candidates for head coach and/or general manager positions. The resolution rewards teams whose minority candidates are hired away for one of those positions by awarding draft selections, which are at the end of the third round, after standard compensatory selections; if multiple teams qualify, they are awarded by draft order in the first round. These picks are in addition to, and have no impact on, the standard 32 compensatory selections. Five picks were awarded for the 2023 draft pursuant to the resolution.

Notes

Forfeited selections

References
Trade references

General references

Events in Kansas City, Missouri
National Football League Draft
Draft
NFL Draft
American football in Missouri
2020s in Kansas City, Missouri
NFL Draft
NFL Draft